The Islamic Salafi Alliance is a Salafi political grouping in Kuwait headed by Khaled al-ـSultan Bin Essa. Its founded in 1981. Of the fifty elected members of Kuwait National Assembly three seats belong to the Islamic Salafi Alliance since the 2013 elections.

In the February 2012 general elections the Islamic Salafi Alliance managed to capture four seats, and another six were taken by people with similar ideas.

Views
The Alliance is against political parties and protests. It is critical of the House of Sabah.

The Islamic Salafi Alliance has managed to introduce laws leading to segregation between sexes at universities, restrictions on mixed sports, dancing and live music.

References

Political parties in Kuwait
Salafi movement
Far-right political parties
1981 establishments in Kuwait